"La Cucaracha" is a traditional Spanish-language folk song.

La Cucaracha may also refer to:
 La Cucaracha (comic strip), a daily comic strip running 2002–present
 La Cucaracha (1934 film), a 1934 film that was one of the first live-action shorts in three color Technicolor
 La Cucaracha (1959 film), a 1959 Mexican film
 La Cucaracha (1998 film), a 1998 American film from director Jack Perez
 La Cucaracha (album), a 2007 album by Ween
 La Cucaracha (horse), a racehorse
 La cucaracha (moth), a moth in the family Crambidae
 La Cucaracha (newspaper), a former newspaper in Pueblo, Colorado
 La Cucaracha, a former roller coaster at Six Flags Over Texas
 Pancho Villa (1878–1923), Mexican revolutionary